Leslie Brown Butler (12 December 1905 – 14 December 1984) was an American politician from the State of Michigan.

Butler of Lansing, Michigan was Chairman of the Michigan Republican Party from 1940 to 1942.

References 

Michigan Republican Party chairs
Michigan Republicans
Politicians from Lansing, Michigan
1905 births
1984 deaths